Elias Molee (January 3, 1845 –   September 27, 1928) was an American journalist, philologist and linguist.

Background
Elias Molee was born in Muskego, Wisconsin, the son of John Evenson Molie and Anne Jacobson Einong.  The original spelling of the family name was Molie. His father emigrated from Tinn in the province of Telemark, Norway in 1839 and was an early farmer in Muskego.

in 1906, while publishing his second book on teutonish, he lived in Tacoma, Washington.

Career
Elias Molee is known as the creator of the languages Amerikan and Tutonish. He also invented a system of shorthand and used only lower case letters (for example, he used "e" in place of "the") and a form of sign language symbols. In his autobiography molee's wandering (written without capital letters, which he considered "cruel, non-ethical, non-artistic, and non-scientific") he describes an idyllic childhood spent listening to tales of Norse mythology in his family's log cabin, eating "good pancakes with milk in e dough n much egg n butter in it," and roaming the fields picking fresh berries, plums and nuts with the local children.

Plea for an American Language, or Germanic-English (1888)
In this book, Molee outlined the negative aspects of English and the positive aspects of more pure languages such as German, Greek, and Irish. He determined to create a new language for the American people that was a mix of all Germanic languages in the country and embodied all the best parts of these other languages. He called this language Amerikan.

Alphabet 
Molee avoided diphthongs and instead preferred one letter for one sound. He create multiple custom letters for this new language, informed by his own understanding of the American aesthetic sense. The letters are numbered because Molee devised a new numbering system that was similar to that of Greek. He believed that using letters for numbers would help to solidify correct pronunciation among the people.

Nouns 
Add -ä (pronounced like "at", "man") to words ending in a consonant. Add -s to words ending in a vowel.

Add `-ɷ` (pronounced like "owe", "know", "old") to words ending in a consonant. Add `-nɷ` to words ending in a vowel.

The plural marker always comes before the possessive.

Comparison 
Add -ɑr and -ɑst (like "ah-r" and "ah-st").

Pronouns

Verbs 
There are eight irregular verbs: *do, is, have, may, can, will, shall* and *worth* (to become), which have been excepted on account of brevity and frequency.

Word Formation

Syntax 
Negation is formed with "na" (pronounced "nay") before the verb.

Pure Saxon English; or, Americans to the Front (1890) 
In Pure Saxon English, Molee builds upon his Amerikan language.

 He reduces the number of unique letters
 Removes the numbering system based on letters in favor of cleaning up the existing English numbers
 Changes a few suffixes

Ultimately, this book is a more conservative version of Amerikan. It is a slight compromise in the ideas in an effort to make the changes more palatable.

Pure Saxon English

Grammar Rules 

 Plurals add a after consonants, and s after vowels.
 The possessive case adds o after consonants, and no after vowels.
 The past tense adds o after consonants, and do after vowels.
 The present participle adds qnd, past participle en.
 The verbal noun adds ing, the infinitive noun qn.
 The masculine noun adds ı̣, the feminine in.
 To verbalize a word, add u (gladu).
 Definite article - singular the, plural dɔ.
 The substantive adjective takes the plural sign.
 To form the infinitive add q.
 Cardinals taken from the present numerals.
 Ordinals formed by adding to cardinals tq.
 Names of days and months - add to ordinals d or m.
 Personal pronouns and auxiliary verbs nearly as before.
 Sich and mɑn (French, on) also employed.
 The suffix i after adjectives refers to persons in general.
 Five irregular adjectives, and eight irregular verbs.
 Lion, lionı̣, lionin, lionetı̣, lionetin, lionet.
 Substantive adjectives add for sex, ı̣, in, it.
 Adjectives from proper nouns regularly derived.
 The personal agent adds qr, ı̣r, etc.; impersonal el.
 The personal actor adds qr; comparative adjective er, est.

Example 
Russian Wolf Story

[A very good and touching piece to speak at school exhibitions and at concerts. It should be spoken slowly and distinctly.]

Som yı̣ra ago, a Russianik qdelman (nobleman) was reisqand (traveling) on bisnes in the ineri (interior) ov Russia, hus wuda qr ful ov wolfa. It was the beginning ov winter, but the frost had seten in erli. His farein (carriage to fare in) rɔlo up tu a gesthaus (hotel), and hı̣ ferlqngo (demanded) a nuspan (relay) ov horsa to bring him tu the nekst standort (station), wher hı̣ wisho tu spend the neit. The gestkı̣per telo him that ther was gefqr (danger) in reising (traveling) so lait, as dɔ wolfa wer aut. But the qdelman thinko the gestkı̣per ɔnli wisho to kı̣p him so as tu fermɔr (increase) his rekening (bill) agenst him; hı̣ saido, therfɔr, it was tu erli for dɔ wolfa to bı̣ aut. Hı̣ then dreivo on mit his weif and cheild inseid the farein.

Systematic English 
Pure Saxon English was explained as the final goal, but Systematic English was introduced as a stepping stone towards that goal; a branch of Pure Saxon English. It consists of only the first 10 grammar rules of Pure Saxon English. It does not require spelling reform.

Example 
Systematic English is, therefore, ordinary English modifien by dɔ ten first rula of the Pure Saxon English grammar and could be introducen at any time without destroying immediate intelligibility. This moderate reform alone would makq English better fitten to be the international language, because more regular, more euphonious, and easier to learnq. If a mixen language must be haden as an international tongue, why would not "Systematic English" do? It is as mixen as Volapuk or Pasilingua, and it is already widely understanden, and has a strong home basis. It would not be as good for schoola and popular knowledge as a pure picturesque Saxon English, but if dɔ leadera of thought and fashion do not love a "Pure Saxon English," then the next best thing to do would be to adoptq "Systematic English." Where there is great power there are great responsibilities. While we take pride in seeing our language become international, we should not forgetq that it ought to be a good one to be worthy of that high honor, and it would be a better language for our childa.

Other Works 
Tutonish (1902)
nu teutonish (1906), 129 p.
altutonish (1911)
alteutonik (1915)
Dynamic Language (1921)
Toito Spike (1923)

References

Sources
Elias Molle, Papers, 1911–1928.  (Norwegian-American Historical Association. 15 items. P 243)
Emigration from the Community of Tinn, 1837–1907: Demographic, Economic, and Social Background (by Andres A. Svalestuen translated by C. A. Clausen. Norwegian-American Historical Association. Volume 29, Page 43)

External links
Elias Molee Collection, Luther College 

1845 births
1928 deaths
Constructed language creators
American people of Norwegian descent
Writers from Milwaukee
People from Muskego, Wisconsin
Speakers of international auxiliary languages
Writers from Tacoma, Washington